Brænne is a Norwegian surname. Notable people with the surname include:

People
Bendik Brænne (born 1987), Norwegian musician
Berit Brænne (1918–1976), Norwegian actress and writer
Bernhard Brænne (1854–1927), Norwegian businessman and politician
Randi Brænne (1911–2004), Norwegian actress
Trond Brænne (1953–2013), Norwegian actor, writer and radio personality

Other
Brænne Mineralvatn, Norwegian bottling company

Norwegian-language surnames